The Jubba Valley is a valley in East Africa.

It follows the line of the Jubba River north from the Indian Ocean to the Somalia-Ethiopia border. The valley then splits, one branch following the Dawa River west along the Ethiopia-Kenya frontier, then north into Ethiopia, and the other branch follows the Ganale Dorya River north into Ethiopia.

Along with the Shebelle Valley, and nearby lakes Chamo and Abaya, the Jubba Valley is considered an Endemic Bird Area by Birdlife International.

The Somali section of the Jubba Valley is known as Jubaland.

See also
Nugaal Valley

References
Jubba and Shabeelle valleys

Jubba River
Valleys of Ethiopia
Valleys of Somalia
Valleys of Kenya